Edward Anderson (born 26 June 1949), is a Scottish former football defender.

Career
Anderson joined Clyde in 1969, signing from junior side Kirkintilloch Rob Roy. He spent his entire senior career with the Bully Wee, making over 350 appearances in all competitions during his 11-year spell at Shawfield Stadium.

Honours 
 Rob Roy
 Scottish Junior Cup: Runner-up 1968–69

 Clyde
 Scottish Division Two: 1972–73

 Scottish Second Division:  1977–78

References

Living people
1949 births
Scottish footballers
Scottish Football League players
Clyde F.C. players
Kirkintilloch Rob Roy F.C. players
Association football fullbacks
Footballers from Glasgow